Bulbophyllum apodum is a species of orchid in the genus Bulbophyllum. It bears a 12–14 cm inflorescence with around 40 small fragrant white flowers on it. It is native to Borneo, China, Malaysia, Thailand, the Philippines, Vanuatu, and Vietnam.

References
The Bulbophyllum-Checklist
The Internet Orchid Species Photo Encyclopedia

External links 
 
 

apodum
Taxa named by Joseph Dalton Hooker
Bulbophyllum ebulbe